Simon Fourcade (born 25 April 1984) is a French former biathlete and non-commissioned officer. He won a gold medal in the individual at the 2003 Biathlon Junior World Championships. Although he never took a solo World Cup race win, he took eight World Cup wins as a member of relay teams - six in men's relays and two in mixed relays. He retired from competition in March 2019.

He is the older brother of fellow biathlete Martin Fourcade.

Results

Olympics

World Championships
5 medals (1 gold, 3 silver, 1 bronze)

*During Olympic seasons competitions are only held for those events not included in the Olympic program.
**The single mixed relay was added as an event in 2019.

Biathlon World Cup

Relay victories
8 victories

References

External links
Personal website

1984 births
Living people
Sportspeople from Perpignan
French male biathletes
Olympic biathletes of France
Biathletes at the 2006 Winter Olympics
Biathletes at the 2010 Winter Olympics
Biathletes at the 2014 Winter Olympics
Biathlon World Championships medalists